Peter Hudnut (born February 16, 1980) is an American water polo player. He was a member of the United States men's national water polo team at the 2008 Beijing Olympics. In the championship game, the USA team won the silver medal, defeated by Hungary.

He attended John Thomas Dye Elementary school, then Harvard-Westlake School. He then attended Stanford University, where he was on the university's water polo team. He also received his MBA from Stanford University's Graduate School of Business in 2011. He currently works in real estate development in Los Angeles.

See also
 List of Olympic medalists in water polo (men)

References

External links
 

1980 births
Living people
American male water polo players
Water polo centre backs
Stanford Cardinal men's water polo players
Water polo players at the 2008 Summer Olympics
Water polo players at the 2012 Summer Olympics
Olympic silver medalists for the United States in water polo
Medalists at the 2008 Summer Olympics
Water polo players at the 2011 Pan American Games
Pan American Games gold medalists for the United States
Pan American Games medalists in water polo
Medalists at the 2011 Pan American Games
Harvard-Westlake School alumni